Doctor Pierce may refer to:
Hawkeye Pierce, lead fictional character of the book, film, and television series M*A*S*H
Ray Vaughn Pierce (1840–1914), seller of patent medicines and U.S. congressman
William Luther Pierce (1933–2002), founder of the white separatist National Alliance organization

See also Doctor Peirce:
Bill Peirce (b. 1938), economist and 2006 Ohio gubernatorial candidate